Flumpool (stylized as flumpool) are a Japanese rock band. The band, originally from Osaka Prefecture, was formed in January 2007. The band's name is a portmanteau of the words four (from the number of members in the band), lump, and pool. Thus, the name could be interpreted to mean "collective mass of four" or a "quartet".

On 1 October 2008, the band released a download single named . Their debut mini-album (though its length is over 48 minutes), Unreal was released on 10 November 2008. Unreal served Platinum certification from the RIAJ for its shipment of 250,000 copies.

History

2002: cube
In 2002, Yamamura, along with his childhood friends, Sakai and Amakawa, formed an acoustic unit named 309. Later, when a support drummer joined them, they formed a band. From then, they changed their name to cube. Yamamura plays acoustic guitar as well as does most vocals. Sakai also plays acoustic guitar while Amakawa plays bass guitar. Furthermore, they issued four independent CD productions.

2007: flumpool
In January 2007, Ogura joined the band as the drummer. On 13 January, the band's name was changed to flumpool. They held live gigs in Osaka-jō Hall and "live houses" around Osaka. On 24 July, the production of an independent single titled  was announced.

2008: Debut
On 25 June, "Mirai Kanai" went up for sale on indiesmusic.com. In July, the promotional video of "labo" was made. The video was ranked number one on Access Rankings. On 27 August, both Tower Records and Tsutaya held the 5,000 limited copies of the independent trial single, "labo". On 1 September, they became the Campaign Song Artist for the telephone service, au KDDI "LISMO". On September 20, their song, "Hana ni Nare" was used for the campaign.

On 5 September, the band was featured on Fuji TV's Mezamashi TV and performed on television for the first time. On October 1, they released  as their first digital single with Amuse, Inc. under the newly created sub-label A-Sketch. In just ten days, the song reached 1,000,000 downloads (now 2,000,000). On November 5, they released their second digital single, . The song was used as the theme song of TBS drama, Bloody Monday. On the same month, they released their first mini-album, Unreal on the 19th. It reached No. 2 on Oricon weekly albums chart.

2009: What's flumpool!?
On 19 February, the band launched their first nationwide tour, "flumpool tour 2009『UNREAL』" with seven performances in six cities. Later in that month, the band released their first major single,  and reached No. 2 on Oricon weekly singles chart.

Their second single was released on 1 July, entitled  and reached No. 3 on Oricon weekly singles chart. On the same day, their first Live DVD, "『How did we feel then?~flumpool tour 2009 "Unreal" Live at Shibuya Club Quattro~』" was released and reached No. 1 on Oricon weekly Music DVD Chart.

A week after the releases, the band began their second nationwide tour, "flumpool tour 2009 "Unclose"" at 18 venues. The tour comprised a total of 19 performances.

On 14 October, the band released their third digital single, "Frame". On 18 November, they released yet another digital single, "Mitsumeteitai".

The band released their first full album, What's flumpool!? on 23 December and reached No. 2 on the Oricon weekly albums chart.

2010: Vocalist's polypectomy and year-end arena lives
On 3 February, the band released their third single, "Zanzō" and reached No. 3 on Oricon weekly singles chart. The song was used as the theme song of the second season of TBS drama, Bloody Monday. On the same month, they released their second live DVD, "flumpool tour 2009『Unclose』Special!! LIVE at Nippon Budokan". It also reached No. 1 on Oricon weekly Music DVD chart.

On 5 March, the band started their third nationwide tour, "flumpool tour 2010「What's flumpool!?~Love&Piiiis Kids Show!!~」" at 40 venues and 46 performances in total. The tour lasted three months.

On 14 March, the band released their first artist photobook, "fourbond".

It was made known on 29 April that flumpool's vocalist, Ryuta Yamamura would undergo polypectomy in June. On 5 May, Ryuta Yamamura announced on "flumpool ROCKS!", flumpool's corner of the radio program TOKYO FM's SCHOOL OF ROCK!, that he will undergo polypectomy after their last concert of the third tour in Okinawa and spend about a month resting.

The band released their fourth major single entitled  on 23 June. It reached No. 2 on Oricon weekly singles chart. The song, "reboot~Akiramenai Uta~" was used as a support song of Japanese television network NTV's coverage of the FIFA World Cup.

As of 7 July, Yamamura made a Tanabata return after surgery at "flumpool ROCKS!". On 1 August, flumpool performed at "SETSTOCK'10" which was held in Hiroshima. It was their first live after the return of their vocalist.

It was announced on 14 July that the band would sing the theme song entitled  of the movie Kimi ni Todoke. The song "Kimi ni Todoke" was released as a single on 29 September. It debuted at No. 2 on the Oricon weekly singles chart. All five major single releases to date have made it to top three on the Oricon weekly singles chart.

The band released a Christmas DVD single entitled . The release is limited to the members of POOLSIDE, the band's mobile fan club. This first time ever members limited release is a premium package which includes a Special DVD encompassing flumpool's "gratitude" and an original calendar (2011). The song "Snowy Nights Serenade～心までも繋ぎたい～(Xmas ver.)" was the main theme of their year-end arena lives which were held on December 18 and 19 at Osaka-jō Hall and on 25 and 26 December at Yokohama Arena. They expressed their gratitude to their fans for staying with them in the year since the opening of POOLSIDE by turning the words they can't convey very well into this song.

On 31 December, flumpool attended the 61st NHK Kōhaku Uta Gassen, performing on the show for the second time.

2011–2012: Fantasia of Life Stripe
flumpool held a live tour with rock band, Nico Touches the Walls in January in 3 cities.

The band released their second full album on 26 January. The title of the album, Fantasia of Life Stripe was revealed through a CM, aired on 28 November 2010. Details of the album were disclosed on 29 November 2010 on their official website. The album reached No. 2 on the Oricon weekly albums chart.

The band were in charge of the set piece for the Junior High School section of the 78th NHK National Music Contest. A choral composition of the set piece was scheduled to be announced in March. The theme of the contest is "Companions". "Akashi" was NHK's "Minna no Uta" music broadcast in August to September.

The band released their third Live DVD entitled  on April 6. The DVD reached No. 3 on Oricon weekly Music DVD chart.

The band started their fourth nationwide tour entitled  from April in 10 major cities and 19 performances. Due to the 2011 Tōhoku earthquake and tsunami, the band kicked off their tour on 9 April in Fukuoka instead of Yokosuga, Kanagawa on 4 April. The two shows which were scheduled in Yokosuga, Kanagawa are replaced by concerts at Kanagawa Kenmin Hall in Kanagawa on 3 and 4 June. The concerts scheduled 7 and 8 May in Sendai, Miyagi was cancelled. The band will hold a live at Zepp Sendai on 12 August instead. The title of the live is "4th tour 2011 "Fantasia of Life Stripe ～僕達はここにいる～" Zepp Sendai Special Live". In the aftermath of the 11 March earthquake and tsunami in Japan, the band's members and their record label A-Sketch made a donation of 10 million yen to the Japanese Red Cross as part of the fund raising campaign by their agency Amuse. The band will also donate some of the revenue from sales of concert tickets and official goods. They also set up donation boxes at each concert and encourage donations from the crowds.

In May, it was announced that the band would sing the theme song for the "Rugby World Cup 2011".

In June, flumpool's vocalist, Ryuta Yamamura appeared solo in the CM for the mobile game site "Mobage". The song used in the CM is the band's new song which will be released as a double a-side single entitled . The song "Touch" is used as the tie-up song for "au AQUOS PHONE IS11SH" commercial. The single was released on 27 July.

2012–present: experience

On December, flumpool released an album titled experience. With the album they made a debut into Taiwan. With a Chinese cover 証明 written by Mayday Ashin.

On April 17, a concert EARTH X HEART was performed along with Mayday in Japan. In September 2014, Flumpool makes a Single for Indonesian Tokusatsu Series Satria Garuda BIMA-X titled 'Let Tomorrow be'.

On December 6, flumpool announced that it was going on indefinite hiatus. Vocalist Ryuta Yamamura was diagnosed with functional vocal disorder, forcing him to stop his activities and seek treatment.

On January 13 of 2019, Yamamura announced that he had recovered and flumpool would be resuming activities. They released the single HELP on May 22, and announced their ninth concert tour Command Shift Z would start in September and include Hong Kong tour dates.

Band members

 (born January 21, 1985, Osaka)— vocals, guitar
 (born February 26, 1985, Osaka) — guitar
 (born November 27, 1984, Osaka) — bass guitar
 (born February 27, 1984, Hyōgo) — drums, leader

Discography

Albums

Compilation albums

Singles

DVDs

Books

Radio

SPEAK OUT! (J-WAVE) (2009.01.02 - )
SCHOOL OF LOCK! Hana no Keibiin flumpool LOCKS! (SCHOOL OF LOCK! ハナの警備員 flumpool LOCKS!) (Tokyo FM, Wednesdays 23:05-23:30) (2009.10.07 - Present)

Awards and nominations

Billboard Japan Music Awards

|-
| 2010
| Unreal
| King of the Year 2009
| 

MTV Video Music Awards Japan

|-
| 2010
| Dear Mr. & Ms. Picaresque (from MW film)
| Best Video from a Film
| 
|-
| 2011
| Kimi ni Todoke (from Kimi ni Todoke film)
| Best Video from a Film
| 
|}

See also

Japanese rock

References

External links

Official website (in English)
Official website (in Japanese)

Japanese rock music groups
Japanese pop rock music groups
Musical groups from Osaka
Musical quartets
Musical groups established in 2007
A-Sketch artists